Felice Ippolito  (16 November 1915 – 24 April 1997) was an Italian geologist, politician and engineer. He was a fiery promoter of the development of nuclear energy in Italy. His daughter is the actress Angelica Ippolito.

Biography 
Born in Naples, Ippolito graduated in civil engineering with a specialization in geology in 1938, and in 1950 he became Professor of Applied Geology at the University of Naples Federico II. In this role, he contributes to various projects including establishing the Latina, Trino and Garigliano nuclear power plants. In December 1955, he was among the founders of the Italian Radical Party.

In August 1963 an Ippolito case about a supposed maladministration of the CNEN broke in the newspapers. Ippolito was arrested in 1964 and sentenced to 11 years in prison. The case was widely considered as a scapegoat to block nuclear power in favor of the nascent Italian oil industry, and it has also been associated to the mysterious death of Enrico Mattei in 1962. Ippolito was pardoned by Giuseppe Saragat after two years in prison.

In 1968, Ippolito founded  the magazine Le Scienze, the Italian version of Scientific American. Between 1979 and 1989, he was an Independent Left (Sinistra indipendente; SI) MEP, elected on the Italian Communist Party list.

References

External links 

 Felice Ippolito MEP Page 

1915 births
1997 deaths
Engineers from Naples
20th-century Italian geologists
MEPs for Italy 1979–1984
MEPs for Italy 1984–1989
Italian Communist Party politicians
Radical Party (Italy) politicians
University of Naples Federico II alumni
Academic staff of the University of Naples Federico II
Politicians from Naples